Jonathon Ceglar (born 14 February 1991) is an Australian rules football player who plays for the Geelong Football Club in the Australian Football League (AFL). He previously played for the Hawthorn Football Club. Ceglar was also listed with the Collingwood Football Club but did not play a game for them.

Early career
In 2010 he was drafted by the Collingwood Football Club at pick 25 as part of a trade by Gold Coast. Ceglar is a tall, athletic ruckman who can go up forward. Jonathon was a major contributor to Vic Country's win in the AFL Under 18 Championships.

AFL career
Ceglar was picked up by Hawthorn as a rookie in the 2012 AFL Rookie Draft with their 15th pick. After being elevated off the Rookie list Ceglar made his debut against the Brisbane Lions in Launceston in round 14, 2013. He played a second game against  in which he kicked his first goal.

He was promoted to the main player list with selection 59 in the 2013 AFL Draft. He became a senior team regular in the 2014 season and played 15 games, including the Qualifying and Preliminary Finals, but he was unluckily replaced by Ben McEvoy in Hawthorn's winning Grand Final team.

Ceglar had a good start to the 2015 season, playing the first 13 games, but was hampered by injury in the second half. Due to his good performance in the first half of 2015, Ceglar signed a two-year contract extension, which ensured that he remained remain a Hawk until the end of 2017.

Ceglar while playing his 50th game against  unfortunately he ruptured the anterior cruciate ligament in his knee in the penultimate round of the 2016 season requiring a reconstruction.

On September 7, 2017, Ceglar signed a two-year contract extension keeping him at Hawthorn until the end of 2019.

He returned to senior football in 2018, sharing the ruck duties with Ben McEvoy until McEvoy was injured. Following said injury, Ceglar became Hawthorn's primary ruckman for the rest of the season.

.

Statistics
Updated to the end of the 2022 season.

|-
| 2011 ||  || 29
| 0 || — || — || — || — || — || — || — || — || — || — || — || — || — || — || — || — || 0
|-
| 2012 ||  || 29
| 0 || — || — || — || — || — || — || — || — || — || — || — || — || — || — || — || — || 0
|-
| 2013 ||  || 47
| 2 || 1 || 1 || 8 || 3 || 11 || 3 || 3 || 27 || 0.5 || 0.5 || 4.0 || 1.5 || 5.5 || 1.5 || 1.5 || 13.5 || 0
|-
| 2014 ||  || 18
| 15 || 8 || 3 || 79 || 99 || 178 || 50 || 28 || 284 || 0.5 || 0.2 || 5.3 || 6.6 || 11.9 || 3.3 || 1.9 || 18.9 || 0
|-
| 2015 ||  || 18
| 14 || 6 || 5 || 69 || 90 || 159 || 42 || 45 || 325 || 0.4 || 0.4 || 4.9 || 6.4 || 11.4 || 3.0 || 3.2 || 23.2 || 0
|-
| 2016 ||  || 18
| 19 || 14 || 8 || 94 || 105 || 199 || 57 || 50 || 406 || 0.7 || 0.4 || 5.0 || 5.5 || 10.5 || 3.0 || 2.6 || 21.4 || 0
|-
| 2017 ||  || 18
| 0 || — || — || — || — || — || — || — || — || — || — || — || — || — || — || — || — || 0
|-
| 2018 ||  || 18
| 11 || 6 || 1 || 48 || 60 || 108 || 34 || 20 || 239 || 0.5 || 0.1 || 4.4 || 5.5 || 9.8 || 3.1 || 1.8 || 21.7 || 0
|-
| 2019 ||  || 18
| 15 || 5 || 6 || 85 || 115 || 200 || 69 || 34 || 306 || 0.3 || 0.4 || 5.7 || 7.7 || 13.3 || 4.6 || 2.3 || 20.4 || 0
|-
| 2020 ||  || 18
| 13 || 1 || 0 || 55 || 82 || 137 || 29 || 32 || 274 || 0.1 || 0.0 || 4.2 || 6.3 || 10.5 || 2.2 || 2.5 || 21.1 || 2
|-
| 2021 ||  || 18
| 12 || 2 || 2 || 67 || 113 || 180 || 53 || 26 || 249 || 0.2 || 0.2 || 5.6 || 9.4 || 15.0 || 4.4 || 2.2 || 20.8 || 2
|-
| 2022 ||  || 15
| 3 || 0 || 0 || 16 || 19 || 35 || 2 || 2 || 47 || 0.0 || 0.0 || 5.3 || 6.3 || 11.7 || 0.7 || 0.7 || 15.7 || 0
|- class="sortbottom"
! colspan=3| Career
! 104 !! 43 !! 26 !! 521 !! 686 !! 1207 !! 339 !! 240 !! 2157 !! 0.4 !! 0.3 !! 5.0 !! 6.6 !! 11.6 !! 3.3 !! 2.3 !! 20.7 !! 4
|}

Notes

Honours and achievements
Team
 Minor premiership: 2013
 Minor premiership: 2022
 VFL premiership player: 2013
 Minor premiership: 2015

Individual
  best clubman: 2019

References

External links

Box Hill Football Club players
Hawthorn Football Club players
1991 births
Living people
Australian rules footballers from Victoria (Australia)
Murray Bushrangers players
Wodonga Raiders Football Club players
Geelong Football Club players